Erik Stafford is an American economist currently the John A. Paulson Professor at Harvard Business School.

References

Year of birth missing (living people)
Living people
Harvard Business School faculty
American economists
University System of Maryland alumni
University of Chicago alumni